Jiří Gula (born 7 August 1989) is a Czech professional ice hockey defenceman currently playing for the KS Cracovia. He previously played with HC Litvínov in the Czech Extraliga.

References

External links
 iDNES.cz

1989 births
Czech ice hockey defencemen
HC Litvínov players
HK Dukla Trenčín players
MKS Cracovia (ice hockey) players
Sportspeople from Most (city)
Sheffield Steelers players
Living people
Czech expatriate ice hockey players in Slovakia
Czech expatriate sportspeople in England
Czech expatriate sportspeople in Poland
Expatriate ice hockey players in England
Expatriate ice hockey players in Poland